Abraham Anderson (1832 – June 10, 1915) was an American businessman, the founder of the Anderson Preserving Company in 1860. In 1869 he partnered with Joseph A. Campbell and their company became Campbell's Soup in 1920.

Biography
He was born in 1832.

He worked as an icebox manufacturer, and in 1860 founded the Anderson Preserving Company. In 1869 he teamed up with Joseph A. Campbell. In 1876 he left the company.

He died on June 10, 1915, at his home in Haddonfield, New Jersey.

References

1829 births
1915 deaths
Campbell Soup Company people
People from Haddonfield, New Jersey
American company founders
19th-century American businesspeople
Place of birth missing